This is the discography of American disco group Village People.

Albums

Studio albums

Compilation albums

Video albums

Box sets

Singles

Notes

References

Discographies of American artists
Disco discographies
Soul music discographies
Funk music discographies